David Lewis (7 June 1879 – 17 October 1966) was a British sports shooter. He competed in the 50 m rifle event at the 1924 Summer Olympics.

References

External links
 

1879 births
1966 deaths
British male sport shooters
Olympic shooters of Great Britain
Shooters at the 1924 Summer Olympics
Place of birth missing